Strigina was a genus of moths of the family Noctuidae. The genus was described by Savigny in 1816.

Lepidoptera and Some Other Life Forms has this name as a synonym of Polypogon. The Global Lepidoptera Names Index has this as a synonym of Herminia.

References

Hypeninae